Claudio Andrés Latorre Meza (born 8 June 1986) was a Chilean footballer. His last club was San Antonio Unido.

Honours

Player

Individual
 Primera B de Chile Top-scorer (1): 2011 Apertura
 Copa Chile Top-scorer (1): 2011

External links
 
 

1986 births
Living people
Chilean footballers
Coquimbo Unido footballers
Puerto Montt footballers
Unión Española footballers
Magallanes footballers
Deportes Temuco footballers
Deportes Melipilla footballers
Chilean Primera División players
Primera B de Chile players
Association football forwards